Changhong Subdistrict is a subdistrict and the county seat of Qiyang County in Hunan, China. Located in the north central region of the county, the subdistrict was formed in August 2010.

References

Qiyang
County seats in Hunan